Alberto da Giussano (named after Alberto da Giussano, a fictional medieval military leader condottiero) was an Italian , which served in the Regia Marina during World War II. She was launched on 27 April 1930.

She participated in the normal peacetime activities of the fleet in the 1930s as a unit of the 2nd Squadron, including service in connection with the Spanish Civil War. On 10 June 1940 she was part of the 4th Cruiser Division, with the 1st Squadron, together with her sister ship  and was present at the Battle of Punta Stilo in July. She carried out a minelaying sortie off Pantelleria in August, and for the rest of the year acted as distant cover on occasions for troop and supply convoys to North Africa.

On 12 December 1941 she left port together with her sister ship Alberico da Barbiano. Both she and her sister were being used for an emergency convoy to carry gasoline for the German and Italian mobile formations fighting with the Afrika Korps. Jerrycans and other metal containers filled with gasoline were loaded onto both cruisers and were placed on the ships' open decks. The thinking behind using these two cruisers for such a dangerous mission was that their speed would act as a protection. Nonetheless, the ships were intercepted by four Allied destroyers guided by radar on 13 December 1941, in the Battle of Cape Bon. Alberto da Giussano was able to fire only three salvos before being struck by a torpedo amidships and hit by gunfire, which left her disabled and dead in the water. After vain struggle to halt the fire, the crew had to abandon the ship, which broke in two and sank at 4.22. 283 men out of the 720 aboard lost their lives. The ship's commanding officer, Captain Giovanni Marabotto, was among the survivors.

Citations

References

External links
 Alberto da Giussano Marina Militare website

Giussano-class cruisers
Ships built in Genoa
Ships built by Gio. Ansaldo & C.
1930 ships
World War II cruisers of Italy
World War II shipwrecks in the Mediterranean Sea
Maritime incidents in December 1941